Richard Moore (7 May 1973 – 28 March 2022) was a Scottish journalist, author, podcaster, and racing cyclist.

Biography
Moore represented Great Britain at the Tour of Langkawi and Scotland at the PruTour and the 1998 Commonwealth Games, where he competed in the road race and the time trial. 

He was one of the most established cycling journalists around in his day. 
Moore has contributed to Rouleur Magazine, Scotland on Sunday, The Herald, Sunday Herald, The Guardian, Sunday Times, and The Scotsman. His first book was a biography of the cyclist Robert Millar; In Search of Robert Millar won the "Best Biography" category at the 2008 British Sports Book Awards. His second book, Heroes, Villains & Velodromes: Chris Hoy and Britain's Track Cycling Revolution, was published in June 2008. His 2012 book The Dirtiest Race in History: Ben Johnson, Carl Lewis and the Seoul Olympic 100m Final (Wisden Sports Writing), was published in June 2012 and long-listed for the William Hill Sports Book of the Year. 

In 2013, Moore launched The Cycling Podcast, with Lionel Birnie and Daniel Friebe. Initially covering the 2013 Tour de France, the podcast has since expanded into a weekly show with several spin-offs, and more frequent daily podcasts during major events such as the Grand Tours. The podcast has received several awards and nominations, including being given best podcast at the 2016 Cycling Media Awards, and receiving a bronze medal in sports podcast category at the British Podcast Awards in 2018 and, for the Cycling Podcast Feminin spin-off (also co-hosted by Moore) in 2019. As part of a collective of contributors to The Cycling Podcast, Moore is coauthor of two further books published in 2018 and 2019.

Moore died on Monday, 28 March 2022 at his home in Picardy.

Bibliography
In Search of Robert Millar, HarperCollins, September 2007, 
Heroes, Villains & Velodromes: Chris Hoy and Britain's Track Cycling Revolution, HarperCollins, June 2008, 
Sky's the Limit: British Cycling's Quest to Conquer the Tour de France, HarperCollins, June 2011, 
Slaying the Badger: LeMond, Hinault and the Greatest Ever Tour de France, Yellow Jersey, May 2011, 
Tour de France 100: A Photographic History of the World's Greatest Race, VeloPress, June 2013, 
Étape: 20 Great Stages from the Modern Tour de France, VeloPress, June 2014, 
The Dirtiest Race in History: Ben Johnson, Carl Lewis and the Seoul Olympic 100m Final, Wisden Sports Writing, June 2012, 
The Bolt Supremacy:  Inside Jamaica’s Sprint Factory, Yellow Jersey Press, July 2015, 
A Journey Through the Cycling Year, Moore, Richard; Birnie, Lionel; Friebe, Daniel. Yellow Jersey Press, 2018 
The Grand Tour Diaries 2018/19, Moore, Richard; Birnie, Lionel; Friebe, Daniel,; Thomazeau, Francois; Chennaoui, Orla. Vision Sports Publishing Ltd, Nov 2019

References

1973 births
2022 deaths
Scottish sportswriters
Cycling journalists
Cycling writers
Place of death missing
Scottish male cyclists
Cyclists at the 1998 Commonwealth Games
Commonwealth Games competitors for Scotland
Sportspeople from Edinburgh